Pudhumai Pithan is a 1998 Indian Tamil-language political satire film directed by S. K. Jeeva. The film stars Parthiban whilst Roja, Devayani, Priya Raman, Anandaraj and Ranjith play supporting roles. It was released on 20 October 1998. The film opened to mixed reviews and was declared hit at the box office. It was later dubbed into Telugu as 'Oka Votu'. The film was one among 1998 Deepavali releases.

Plot

Jeeva (Parthiban), a social activist, ends up in a police lock-up. Mahesh (Ranjith), a police officer, is surprised to see his best friend Jeeva in this condition and brings him to his home. Mahesh lives happily with his wife Aarthi (Devayani) and his daughter (Baby Hemalatha).

Aarthi and Jeeva were in love in the past. Ramadass (Jai Ganesh), Aarthi's father, hated Jeeva and his activism. As an honest police officer, Ramadass protected a corrupted politician (Anandaraj) and was beaten by Jeeva's supporters. Later, Aarthi and Jeeva split up. Jeeva clashes with the same politician, his whole family dies due to his orders and Jeeva was sent to a mental hospital. Gayathri (Priya Raman), a nurse, helps him to escape from the hospital and then she accommodates him in her house. He later fled.

Now, Jeeva changes his name and is determined to clean up the society. He also falls in love with the prostitute Shenbagam (Roja). Jeeva as Bharath becomes popular among the poor and subsequently becomes a minister.

Cast

Parthiban as Jeeva / Bharath
Roja as Shenbagam
Devayani as Aarthi
Priya Raman as Gayathri
Anandaraj
Ranjith as Mahesh
Jai Ganesh as Ramadass
Vadivelu as 'Super' Suruli
S. S. Chandran
Charle
Delhi Ganesh as Viswanath
Vasu Vikram as Karimuthu
Laxmi Rattan
Sabitha Anand as Bhavani, Jeeva's sister
Dubbing Janaki as Jeeva's mother
Bala Singh
Thiruppur Ramasamy as Ramasamy 
Idichapuli Selvaraj
Joker Thulasi
Shilpa as Anandraj's daughter
Mahanadi Shankar
Crane Manohar as 'Super' Suruli's sidekick
Kovai Senthil
MRK
Pailwan Ranganathan
Muthukaalai
Baby Hemalatha
Shakeela as Vanaja
John Babu in a cameo appearance

Soundtrack

The film score and the soundtrack were composed by Deva. The soundtrack, released in 1998, features 6 tracks with lyrics written by Pulamaipithan, Pazhani Bharathi, Nandalala and Thamarai.

Reception
A critic from Dinakaran noted "The film has tried to establish how a politician could be a good leader too! But it's rather surprising to note how so experienced an artiste like Parthiban forgot the fact that such a subject when dealt with in cinema medium has to be told in an uniformly interesting manner from the beginning till the end". A reviewer from Deccan Herald wrote "the film is often downright silly, when not crass, but it has a kind of senseless appeal. To be honest, it hasn’t gone as far overboard as it could have with its masala mix. It, commendably, has no scenes of communal violence, no religious chauvinism, and its single rape scene is cut short by the mother shooting dead her about-to-be-raped daughter". The film was also reviewed by Times of India.

References

1998 films
Films scored by Deva (composer)
1990s Tamil-language films
Indian political satire films
1990s political satire films